Virginie Dufour is a Canadian politician, who was elected to the National Assembly of Quebec in the 2022 Quebec general election. She represents the riding of Mille-Îles as a member of the Quebec Liberal Party.

Before her election to the provincial legislature, Dufour served on Laval City Council for 8 years.

References

21st-century Canadian politicians
21st-century Canadian women politicians
Quebec Liberal Party MNAs
Women MNAs in Quebec
French Quebecers
Laval, Quebec city councillors
Living people
Year of birth missing (living people)